Džidžikovac, (from "džidži" Bosnian pronunciation for ; in , nađiđan, lijep; or ), is a neighborhood in Sarajevo, Bosnia and Herzegovina, and since 2008 a National Monument of Bosnia and Herzegovina

Location
Džidžikovac is located above central parts of the old city center and just above area where Building of the Presidency of Bosnia and Herzegovina is located, and it is part of Centar municipality.

Džidžikovac and immediate surroundings is also location of several major embassies, with French and Austrian located at the heart of the neighborhood.

History
The central area of the neighbourhood was designed and developed after the World War II, mostly between 1946 and 1959, while streets and areas in immediate surroundings were already developed and had many luxurious villas and buildings constructed during second half of the 19th century, in numerous styles of the era under the architect from around Austro-Hungarian Empire.

Features

As in many other cases around central parts of Sarajevo, neighborhood designers utilized the presence of abundant natural greenery on the location and developed designated space while preserving as much as possible. This became a characteristic of the neighborhood, one which constitutes important quality and attraction.

National monument 
In 2008 Džidžikovc was proclaimed National Monument of Bosnia and Herzegovina as "Residential complex on Džidžikovac – the architectural ensemble" by the Commission to preserve national monuments of Bosnia and Herzegovina, due to its architectural and landscaping qualities.

See also
Sarajevo

References

External links

Neighbourhoods in Grad Sarajevo
Populated places in Centar, Sarajevo
National Monuments of Bosnia and Herzegovina